Kunakulovo (Qunaqqol) is a rural locality (a selo) in Kenger-Meneuzovsky Selsoviet, Bizhbulyaksky District, Bashkortostan, Russia. The population was 514 as of 2010. There are 2 streets.

Geography 
Kunakulovo is located 16 km northeast of Bizhbulyak (the district's administrative centre) by road. Kasimovka is the nearest rural locality.

References 

Rural localities in Bizhbulyaksky District